Helga Molander (born Ruth Werner; 19 March 1896 – 1986), was a German actress and mother of Hans Eysenck.

Life
Helga Molander was born in Königshütte, Upper Silesia, then Germany, to Jewish parents. She began her artistic career in 1918 at the Trianon Theater in Berlin. During the twenties, she performed in a number of silent movies. She played major roles in the productions of the Berlin film producer and director Max Glass in films such as Der Mann mit der Eisernen Maske (Man with the Iron Mask) and Bob und Mary.

With the advent of the Nazi times in Germany, Helga Molander left for France, then to Brazil and then to the United States. In 1957, she married Max Glass. Helga Molander is the mother of psychologist Hans Eysenck.

Filmography

1918: Im Zeichen der Schuld
1919: Der Weg der Grete Lessen
1919: Revenge Is Mine
1919: Verrat und Sühne
 The Gambler (1919)
1919: Anders als die Andern
1920: Der Ruf aus dem Jenseits
 Christian Wahnschaffe (1920)
 Love at the Wheel (1921)
 The Terror of the Red Mill (1921)
 Sappho (1921)
1921: Opfer der Liebe
 Rose of the Asphalt Streets (1922)
1922: Die sündige Vestalin
1922: Der alte Gospodar
1923: Bob and Mary
1923: Der Mann mit der eisernen Maske
 If You Have an Aunt (1925)
 The Man Who Sold Himself (1925)
 Three Waiting Maids (1925)
 The Three Mannequins (1926)
 The Man Without Sleep (1926)
 The Tragedy of a Lost Soul (1927)
1928: Königin Luise (2 Parts)
 The Schorrsiegel Affair (1928)

References

External links 
 Picture of Helga Molander

1896 births
1986 deaths
German stage actresses
German film actresses
German silent film actresses
Jewish German actresses
People from Chorzów
People from the Province of Silesia
20th-century German actresses